Confession of Pain is a 2006 Hong Kong crime drama film directed by Andrew Lau and Alan Mak, starring Tony Leung, Takeshi Kaneshiro, Shu Qi and Xu Jinglei.

Plot summary
Police inspectors Lau Ching-hei and Yau Kin-bong arrest a rapist in 2003. When Yau returns home later, he sees that his pregnant girlfriend has committed suicide by slitting her wrists. Yau is so depressed with her death that he indulges in alcohol and turns in his police badge to work as a private investigator. He becomes obsessed with finding out the reason for his girlfriend's suicide.

Three years later, Yau discovers that his girlfriend had actually cheated on him and she was waiting at a bar for her secret lover on the night she died. Her secret lover did not show up that night because he was involved in a car accident. Yau initially thought that he will be angry with his girlfriend's lover, but he ends up taking care of the comatose man in the hospital. Yau gets over  the unhappy incident and falls in love with Hung, a girl who sells beer in the same bar.

Lau's wife, Susan, is the daughter of the billionaire Chow Yuen-sing. One night, Lau and two accomplices break into his father-in-law's residence, where they kill Chow and his butler, Uncle Man. Later, Lau lures his partners-in-crime to a rundown house and murders them, after which he attempts to make the scene seem as though the two of them killed each other in a dispute over the loot. Susan is not convinced that only the two killers were involved, so she hires Yau to help her investigate further. She has also become paranoid after her father's murder, so Lau has to discreetly give her pills to calm her down and put her to sleep.

After a long investigation, which includes a few dangerous confrontations with a "suspect", Yau discovers Lau's secret and dark past. Chow Yuen-sing had murdered Lau's family members in Macau several years ago when Lau was still a boy, and he bribed the police to close the case. Lau survived, took on a new identity, and grew up in an orphanage before moving to Hong Kong, where he became a police officer. Lau seeks vengeance on Chow and he pretended to fall in love with Susan and married her. He attempts to kill Susan by drugging her and locking her inside the kitchen after turning on the gas. Susan survives, but is badly injured because there was an explosion, and ends up in hospital.

Lau visits Susan in hospital and mentally confesses the truth to her. She reveals that she already knows he tried to murder her because she was still partially conscious when he drugged her and locked her in the kitchen. She then asks him if he ever really loved her. Lau realises that, in his desire for revenge, he has destroyed a new family he created with Susan. Susan does not believe him, loses her will to live, and dies. Yau meets Lau outside the hospital and tells him his conclusion. Lau returns to Susan's room, where he feels overwhelmed by guilt and eventually commits suicide by shooting himself in the head.

Cast
 Tony Leung as Lau Ching-hei
 Takeshi Kaneshiro as Yau Kin-bong
 Shu Qi as Hung
 Xu Jinglei as Susan Chow
 Chapman To as Tsui Wing-kwong
 Elliot Ngok as Chow Yuen-sing
 Emme Wong as Rachel
 Wan Yeung-ming as Uncle Man
 Wayne Lai as Chan Wai-keung
 Ricky Chan as Lai Sun-wah
 Ben Yuen as Wong Ming
 Cheung Kam-ching as Chan Wing-fu
 Elena Kong as Chan Wing-fu's wife

Soundtrack
Ayumi Hamasaki performed the theme song Secret, which appears in the international release of the film. The Mandarin theme song in the Chinese version, Secret of a Forlorn City (傷城秘密), was performed by Denise Ho.

Distribution
Confession of Pain was released in Hong Kong theatres on 21 December 2006. The two-disc DVD edition, two-disc DVD special edition (with postcard book) and VCD edition were all released in Hong Kong on 14 February 2007. The DVD editions feature audio in DTS-ES and a second disc featuring a documentary of the making of the movie, photo galleries and other bonus features. The Japanese release rights went to Avex Trax, with the title "Kizudarake no Otokotachi" (傷だらけの男たち), which roughly translates as Heavily Scarred Men.

Sponsors of the film include: Giorgio Armani, Ayumi Hamasaki, 1010, San Miguel, Citicall, Philip Stein, D-Link, Neway and APM.

Reception

Box office
Confession of Pain opened in Hong Kong in the same week as Zhang Yimou's Curse of the Golden Flower and was beaten on the opening day, but was still able to generate box office revenues of HK$3 million on its opening weekend.

Critical reception
Critical reception towards the film was mixed. Most critics positively reviewed the performances by Tony Leung and Takeshi Kaneshiro, but criticized the script as being weak or lacking suspense because it gives away too much too soon.

Andrew Chan of the Film Critics Circle of Australia writes, "Ultimately the film is too predictable to be a thriller, too few “Chapman To” to be a comedy and far too much Shu Qi to be not entirely annoying. With that being said, the most important element that this film lacks is the almost non-existent connection with the audience and the effect is leaving the audience muddled up and confused."

Awards and nominations
The film was nominated for seven awards in the 26th Hong Kong Film Awards, including Best Screenplay, Best Actor, Best Cinematography, Best Film Editing, Best Art Direction, Best Costume and Make-Up Design, and Best Original Film Score. However, it only won one award for Best Cinematography.

Remake
A Hollywood remake of Confession of Pain was announced by Warner Bros., who bought the rights of the film. Leonardo DiCaprio's production company, Appian Way, is producing the film alongside Roy Lee, who brokered the remake deals on Asian movies from The Ring to Infernal Affairs. At the moment, however, it is not yet known if DiCaprio, who also starred in the Hollywood remake of Infernal Affairs (another Lau/Mak film), The Departed, will also star in the film. William Monahan, who won a Best Adapted Screenplay Oscar for The Departed, will work on the script.

References

External links
 Official website
 Official Japanese website
 

2006 films
2006 crime drama films
Hong Kong crime drama films
Hong Kong detective films
2000s Cantonese-language films
Media Asia films
Basic Pictures films
Films directed by Andrew Lau
Films directed by Alan Mak
Hong Kong films about revenge
Films about alcoholism
Films set in Hong Kong
Films shot in Hong Kong
2000s Hong Kong films